Sir John Barnett (born July 1, 1982), known professionally as Sir John, is a make-up artist, activist, influencer, and executive. He is best known for being a creative collaborator and make-up artist of Beyoncé. Among those he has done make-up work for include Naomi Campbell, Serena Williams, Chrissy Teigen, Priyanka Chopra, Margot Robbie, Zendaya, Naomi Osaka, Mary J Blige, Iman, Celine Dion, Viola Davis, Erykah Badu, Joan Smalls, and Kat Graham. Sir John is a creative director for L'Oreal Paris USA and the Chief creative officer of CTZN Cosmetics.

Early life 
Sir John was born in Buffalo, New York. He took interest in art at early age—receiving formal training from the age of six. Sir John honed his skillset at the Buffalo Academy for Visual and Performing Arts (BAVPA). At the age of eighteen, he moved to Atlanta, Georgia, following his passion for art, to study art history, printmaking, and sculpture at American InterContinental University.

While in Atlanta, Sir John serendipitously discovered a love for make-up. His friend, a catalog model, invited him to accompany her to a photo shoot for an upcoming spread. The make-up artist for the shoot canceled at the last minute and the shoot photographer, recognizing that Sir John studied art, offered him the opportunity to do his friend's make-up. The following week, the photographer invited Sir John to work on another photo shoot, and soon introduced Sir John to some of his friends in the cosmetic industry; this led to his first full-time job at a local make-up counter for MAC Cosmetics. At the age of 19, Sir John was transferred to work at MAC's SoHo Bloomingdales location in New York City.

At the age of 23, he pivoted into visual merchandising and executed displays for Barneys New York, Henri Bendel, Bergdorf Goodman, and Gucci. Concurrently, he moonlighted as a make-up artist at the Riviera Gentlemen's Club in Astoria, Queens.

Career

Pat McGrath and Charlotte Tilbury 
In 2010, while on a lunch break, Sir John ran into his old friend Yadim Carranza—a make-up artist that he knew from his time at MAC and a lead assistant of British make-up artist Pat McGrath. This encounter led to an opportunity to work as a make-up artist under the wing of Pat McGrath—first in Bryant Park, New York City, and, shortly thereafter, during Milan Fashion Week. In Milan, Sir John served as a make-up artist at his first show ever, the Dolce & Gabbana fashion show. He also worked Prada's fashion show and, at Bulgari Hotel Milano, with his first celebrity client, Naomi Campbell.

Soon after working at Milan Fashion Week, Sir John began assisting British make-up artist Charlotte Tilbury. In September 2010, Tilbury introduced him to Beyoncé, at Tom Ford's first womenswear show during New York Fashion Week. At the Tom Ford show, Sir John made his debut as Beyoncé's make-up artist, at the same time that Beyoncé made her debut as a runway model. In 2012, Sir John signed an agreement with Beyoncé to become her make-up artist.

Beyoncé 
As Beyoncé's make-up artist, Sir John designed dozens looks spanning her body of work, from music videos and magazine spreads, to the Super Bowl, world tours, and red carpet appearances.

Beyoncé Album 
In 2013, Sir John created Beyoncé's looks for the Beyoncé (album). Her self-titled fifth studio album is a two-disc album that includes an audio disc (disc one) and a "visual album" (disc two), where all 18 tracks are accompanied by non-linear short films. Among other videos for the album, he created Beyoncé's looks for two videos that accompanied the two-part tracks "Haunted" and "Partition." He also did her make-up in "Pretty Hurts," "Drunk in Love," "Blow," "No Angel," "Formation," "Jealous," "Rocket," "Mine," "XO," "Flawless," "Superpower," "Heaven," "Blue," and "Grown Woman."

Super Bowl 50 Halftime Show 
In 2016, Sir John designed Beyoncé's make-up for the Super Bowl 50 halftime show. Her make-up was lauded as an "insanely gorgeous coppery dream of a makeup look" by Cosmopolitan,  "#flawless" by Glamour, and one of the "most memorable Super Bowl beauty moments" by Allure. During the Super Bowl 50 Halftime Show, Beyoncé announced her seventh concert tour, in support of her sixth studio album Lemonade, The Formation World Tour.

The Formation World Tour and Lemonade 

Sir John conceived and fine tuned her look for 49 sold-out shows, spanning 16 countries. The palette for The Formation World Tour consisted of warmer tones—bronze and terracotta shades. In alignment with Beyonce's 2016 Elle US, UK, and France magazine covers, Sir John focused on skin glow and naturalness.

"Beychella" 
In 2018, Sir John was responsible for Beyoncé's make-up during her performance at Coachella—dubbed "Beychella"—when she became the first black woman to headline the event. According to Sir John, he wanted Beyoncé to " look like a college girl on campus", a look that was inspired by the 1988 film School Daze.

60th Annual Grammy Awards 
That same year he partnered with Beyoncé to help create three looks for the pre-Grammy Roc Nation Brunch, 2018 Clive Davis Recording Academy Gala, and the 60th Annual Grammy Awards.

American Beauty Star 
Sir John became an executive producer (alongside Adriana Lima, Norton Herrick, and Ross Elliot) and in-show mentor for an American competition reality television series on Lifetime, American Beauty Star. The series ran for two seasons—Sir John was a mentor during both seasons—and featured Adriana Lima, Ashley Graham, Christie Brinkley, Russell James, and Yu Tsai.

Executive leadership 
In 2015, Sir John was named a creative director for L’Oréal Paris USA, making him the brand's first Black creative director in the United States. In 2022, he was tapped as Chief creative officer of CTZN Cosmetics.

Make-up work

Print 
{| class="wikitable sortable"
|+
!Date
!Subject(s)
!Publication/Organization
!Media
!Editor/Stylist
!Photographer
!Hair Stylist
!Source
|-
|July 2022
|Beyoncé
|British Vogue
|Cover and Editorial
|Edward Enninful
|Rafael Pavarotti
|Jawara
|<ref>{{Cite web |last=Saltzman |first=Stephanie |title=Beyoncé Covers British 'Vogues July 2022 Issue |url=https://fashionista.com/2022/06/beyonce-british-vogue-cover-july-2022 |access-date=2022-07-16 |website=Fashionista |language=en}}</ref>
|-
|June 2022
|Naomi Osaka
|Dazed Magazine
|Cover and Editorial
|Ai Kamoshita
|Justin French
|Marty Harper
|
|-
|March 2022
|Emma Chamberlain
|Harper's Bazaar Singapore
|Cover and Editorial
|Martina Nilsson
|Yu Tsai 
|Rob Talty
|
|-
|October 2021
|Cynthia Erivo
|The Cut
|Cover and Editorial
|Jessica Willis 
|Amber Pinkerton
|Coree Moreno
|
|-
|March 2021
|Chloe Bailey, Halle Bailey 
|Vogue
|Editorial
|Gabriella Karefa-Johnson
|Julie Dash
|Rachel Lee 
|
|-
|November 2020
|Doja Cat
|Narcisse Magazine|Cover
|Olga Yanul
|Greg Swales
|Frederic Kebbabi 
|
|-
|October 2020
|Gabrielle Union
|Marie Claire|Cover
|Thomas Christos Kikis
|Djeneba Aduayom
|Larry Sims
|
|-
|May 2020
|Megan Thee Stallion
|Marie Claire|Cover
|Memsor Kamarake
|Micaiah Carter 
|Kellon Deryck
|
|-
|February 2020
|Zendaya, Storm Reid
|Love Magazine
|Cover and Editorial
|Law Roach 
|Alasdair McLellan
|Jawara 
|
|-
|January 2020
|Beyoncé
|Elle
|Cover and Editorial
|Karen Langley
|Melina Matsoukas
|Neal Farinah
|
|-
|September 2018
|Beyoncé
|Vogue
|Cover and Editorial
|Tonne Goodman
|Tyler Mitchell
|–
|
|-
|February 2018
|Mary J. Blige
|New York Magazine
|Cover
|Law Roach
|René & Radka
|Larry Sims
|
|-
|July 2017
|Ashley Graham
|Glamour
|Cover
|Jillian Davison 
|Nathaniel Goldberg
|Shon 
|
|-
|June 2017
|Anais Mali, Jourdan Dunn
|Glamour
|Editorial
|Jillian Davison 
|Victor Demarchelier 
|David von Cannon
|
|-
|March 2017
|Alécia Morais, Amilna Estevao
|Elle U.S.
|Editorial
|Samira Nasr
|Mark Seliger
|Kevin Ryan
|
|-
|December 2016
|Aline Weber
|Harper's Bazaar Kazakhstan
|Cover and Editorial
|Anna Katsanis
|–
|Michael Silva
|
|-
|October 2016
|Amanda Murphy
|Elle U.S.
|Editorial
|Samira Nasr 
|Liz Collins
|Kevin Ryan
|
|-
|October 2016
|Naomi Scott
|Elle U.S.
|Editorial
|Samira Nasr 
|Liz Collins
|Kevin Ryan
|
|-
|August 2016
|Pyper America Smith 
|Seventeen Magazine
|Editorial
|James Worthington Demolet 
|–
|Thanos Samaras 
|
|-
|July 2016
|Serena Williams
|Glamour
|Cover
|Jillian Davison
|Norman Jean Roy
|Ursula Stephen 
|
|-
|June 2016
|Margot Robbie
|Vogue
|Cover
|Tonne Goodman
|Mert and Marcus
|Shay Ashual
|
|-
|May 2016
|Katrin Thormann
|Vogue Ukraine|Editorial
|Olga Yanul 
|An Le 
|Joey George
|
|-
|May 2016
|Beyoncé
|Elle U.S.
|Cover and Editorial
|Samira Nasr
|Paola Kudacki
|Kim Kimble
|
|-
|May 2016
|Beyoncé
|Elle UK
|Cover
|–
|Paola Kudacki
|–
|
|-
|April 2016
|Beyoncé
|Elle France
|Cover
|–
|Paola Kudacki
|–
|
|-
|April 2016
|Viktoriya Sasonkina 
|Marie Claire Russia
|Cover and Editorial
|Anna Rykova
|Jack Waterlot 
|Olivier Lebrun
|
|-
|March 2016
|Georgia Fowler
|Marie Claire Russia
|Cover and Editorial
|Anna Rykova
|Jack Waterlot
|Olivier Lebrun
|
|-
|February 2016
|Anastasia Ivanova 
|Elle Mexico
|Cover and Editorial
|–
|Santiago Ruisenor
|Cash Lawless 
|
|-
|February 2016
|Emma Stern Nielsen 
|Marie Claire Russia
|Cover and Editorial
|Anna Rykova
|–
|Olivier Lebrun
|
|-
|January 2016
|Anja Cihoric 
|Elle Mexico
|Cover and Editorial
|–
|Santiago Ruisenor
|Cash Lawless
|
|-
|October 2015
|Beyoncé
|Beat Magazine|Editorial
|Karen Langley
|Ryan McGinley
|–
|
|-
|September 2015
|Joan Smalls
|Vogue Mexico|Cover and Editorial
|Sarah Gore Reeves
|Russell James
|Italo Gregorio
|
|-
|September 2015
|Beyoncé
|Vogue
|Editorial
|Camilla Nickerson
|Anton Corbijn
|–
|
|-
|August 2015
|Joan Smalls
|Sunday Style Australia|Editorial
|–
|Todd Barry
|Jennifer Yepez
|
|-
|June 2015
|Iman
|Vanity Fair Italia|Cover and Editorial
|–
|Markus & Koala
|Chuckie Amos
|
|-
|May 2015
|Joan Smalls
|Lucky Magazine
|Cover and Editorial
|Samantha Traina
|Miguel Reveriego
|Jennifer Yepez
|
|-
|January 2015
|Ilse De Boer
|Vogue Ukraine|Cover and Editorial
|Amy Mach
|Jack Waterlot
|Jon Reyman
|
|-
|December 2015
|Alena Blohm 
|The Coveteur|Editorial
|Emma Cali 
|Adam Franzino 
|Sasha Nesterchuk
|
|-
|October 2014
|Joan Smalls
|Self Magazine
|Cover and Editorial
|Melissa Ventosa Martin 
|Patrick Demarchelier 
|Jennifer Yepez
|
|-
|May 2014
|Beyoncé
|Time Magazine
|Cover and Editorial
|–
|Paola Kudacki
|–
|
|-
|October 2013
|Naomi Campbell
|Harper's Bazaar España
|Cover and Editorial
|Juan Cebrian
|Xevi Muntane
|–
|
|}

 Awards 
In 2016, Sir John was crowned InStyle'' Makeup Artist of the Year.

Personal life 
Sir John currently resides in Hancock Park, Los Angeles, California.

References 

American make-up artists
L'Oréal people
1982 births
Living people